The Wish Maker is the first novel by Pakistani author Ali Sethi. Published in 2009 by Riverhead Books, it tells the story of Zaki Shirazi, a young boy from United States who returned to Lahore, Pakistan after finishing his studies to celebrate the wedding of his childhood friend Samar Api and observe a completely new Pakistan. The story is set against the backdrop of tumultuous events, from the Zia-ul-Haq reign to Zulfiqar Bhutto's execution and Benazir Bhutto elections, it also dictates United States help to Afghan mujahideen during the Soviet military intervention in Afghanistan.

The Wish Maker has been often compared with Khaled Hosseini's The Kite Runner, due to its similar tone to Hosseini's tale which depicts the pre-revolutionary Afghanistan with warmth and humour despite the tense political undercurrent. Sethi has commented that he considered the name of the book, The Wish Maker,  "so important" because it describes "to what he was trying to say". The political themes, social concerns, family relationships and 90s' era of Lahore is prominent throughout the novel.

Synopsis
Zaki Shirazi has arrived back in Lahore, Pakistan, to celebrate the wedding of his childhood friend and elder cousin Samar Api to her long sought-after 'Amitabh' - a stand-in for the Bollywood star she always dreamed of marrying. Amidst the flurry of preparations in the house in which he grew up, Zaki can't help but revisit the past - his childhood as a fatherless boy growing up in a household of outspoken women and his and Samar's intertwined journeys from youth to adulthood. Raised to consider themselves 'part of the same litter', Zaki and Samar watched American television together, memorized dialogues from Bollywood movies and attended dangerous protests with Zaki's campaigning, political journalist mother. But as Zaki becomes drawn into Samar's secret life of romantic schemes and lends her his support in trying to orchestrate the future, they both find themselves suffering the consequences.

Characters
 Zaki Shirazi
 Naseem
 Zakia
 Samar Api
 Tara Tanvir 
 Saif
 Uzma
 Kazim
 Jamal

Reception

The Wish Maker received widespread acclaim and recognition. It was ranked on no. 8 at Vogue Top Ten Summer Books. The book has been translated into Italian, Dutch, German, Hindi, Chinese and Turkish language.

In a review, The New York Times called it "a first-rate novel", stating that "Sethi's prose evokes the comic mislocutions of Jonathan Safran Foer and the vertiginous mania of Zadie Smith. The Wall Street Journal stated that, "Mr. Sethi is especially alive to the emotional contours of young love, its modes of courtship, its methods of subterfuge... Mr. Sethi's prose, always lucid, often soars to illuminate the quotidian." Arifa Akbar of The Independent also reviewed the book positively saying, "Sethi's narration is engaging and funny, and although it rambles off into distracted corners at times, it is slickly structured. It takes us from the present day, back across personal and political histories, and returns to a bittersweet ending which reminds us of the power of making wishes and the miracle of having them, even in part, fulfilled."

Writing for Dawn News Mehar Khursheed wrote, "A commendable quality in the novel was the way in which a child’s point of view is presented to the reader, as it takes one back to the insecurity that comes with the smallness of age and stature. For a debut novel, it is not too indecent an effort. However, English literature from Pakistan will always have a lot at stake as the audience and the expectation to deliver the culture, times and region one has set out to represent, responsibly and honestly, is twofold."

The novel was long-listed for the 2011 DSC Prize for South Asian Literature but couldn't made it to the final six nominations, ultimately losing to H. M. Naqvi's, Home Boy. It was also shortlisted for 2010 Shakti Bhatt First Book Award.

Awards

References

External links

 The Wish Maker at Penguin Books (Parent company of Riverhead Books)
 The Wish Maker at Goodreads
 The Wish Maker at Amazon UK
 The Wish Maker at Fiction2.com

2009 American novels
Novels set in Lahore
Pakistani-American novels
Riverhead Books books
2009 debut novels